The 2022 FIFA World Cup was an international football tournament held in Qatar from 20 November to 18 December 2022. The 32 national teams involved in the tournament were required to register a squad of up to 26 players, including three goalkeepers. Only players in these squads were eligible to take part in the tournament.

A provisional release list of between 35 and 55 players per national team was submitted to FIFA by 21 October 2022, one month prior to the opening match of the tournament. The release lists were not made public by FIFA. From the preliminary squad, the final list of at most 26 and at least 23 players per national team were submitted to FIFA by 14 November, 19:00 AST (UTC+3), six days prior to the opening match of the tournament. FIFA published the final lists with squad numbers on their website on 15 November. The final matchday at club level for players named in the final squads was 13 November 2022, while clubs had to release their players by the following day. In the event that a player on the submitted squad list suffered from an injury or illness prior to his team's first match of the tournament, that player could be replaced at any time up to 24 hours before their first match. The team doctor and the FIFA General Medical Officer had to both confirm that the injury or illness was severe enough to prevent the player from participating in the tournament. Replacement players did not need to be limited to the preliminary list.

On 23 June 2022, the Bureau of the FIFA Council approved the increase of the maximum number of players included on the release list (from 35 to 55) and final list (from 23 to 26). This was due to the timing of the tournament in the football calendar and the disruptive effects caused by the COVID-19 pandemic.

The position listed for each player is per the official squad list published by FIFA. The age listed for each player is as of 20 November 2022, the first day of the tournament. The numbers of caps and goals listed for each player do not include any matches played after the start of the tournament. The club listed is the club for which the player last played a competitive match prior to the tournament. The nationality for each club reflects the national association (not the league) to which the club is affiliated. A flag is included for coaches who are of a different nationality to their team.

Group A

Ecuador
Coach:  Gustavo Alfaro

Ecuador announced their final squad on 14 November 2022.

Netherlands
Coach: Louis van Gaal

The Netherlands announced a 39-man preliminary squad on 21 October 2022. The final squad was announced on 11 November.

Qatar
Coach:  Félix Sánchez

Qatar announced their final squad on 11 November 2022.

Senegal
Coach: Aliou Cissé

Senegal announced their final squad on 11 November 2022. Sadio Mané withdrew injured on 17 November, and was replaced by Moussa N'Diaye on 20 November.

Group B

England

Coach: Gareth Southgate

England announced their final squad on 10 November 2022. Ben White withdrew from the squad on 30 November due to personal reasons.

Iran

Coach:  Carlos Queiroz

Iran announced their final squad, containing 25 players rather than the allowed 26, on 13 November 2022.

United States

Coach: Gregg Berhalter

The United States announced their final squad on 9 November 2022.

Wales
Coach: Rob Page

Wales announced their final squad on 9 November 2022.

Group C

Argentina
Coach: Lionel Scaloni

Argentina announced their final squad on 11 November 2022. Nicolás González withdrew injured and was replaced by Ángel Correa on 17 November. On the same day, Joaquín Correa withdrew injured, and was replaced by Thiago Almada on 18 November.

Mexico
Coach:  Gerardo Martino

Mexico announced a 31-man preliminary squad on 26 October 2022. The squad was reduced to 30 players on 9 November as Jesús Corona withdrew injured. The final squad was announced on 14 November.

Poland
Coach: Czesław Michniewicz

Poland announced a 47-man preliminary squad on 20 October 2022. The final squad was announced on 10 November. Bartłomiej Drągowski withdrew injured and was replaced by Kamil Grabara on 13 November.

Saudi Arabia
Coach:  Hervé Renard

Saudi Arabia announced a 32-man preliminary squad on 16 October 2022. The final squad was announced on 11 November. Fahad Al-Muwallad was replaced by Nawaf Al-Abed on 13 November after WADA appealed the decision to lift Al-Muwallad's suspension.

Group D

Australia
Coach: Graham Arnold

Australia announced their final squad on 8 November 2022. Martin Boyle withdrew injured and was replaced by Marco Tilio on 20 November.

Denmark
Coach: Kasper Hjulmand

Denmark announced 21 of the 26 players in their final squad on 7 November 2022. The final five players were announced on 13 November.

France
Coach: Didier Deschamps

France announced their 25-player final squad on 9 November 2022. The final squad was extended to 26 players on 14 November with the addition of Marcus Thuram. On the same day, Presnel Kimpembe withdrew injured and was replaced by Axel Disasi. Christopher Nkunku withdrew injured on 15 November, and was replaced by Randal Kolo Muani on 16 November. It was announced on 20 November that Karim Benzema had suffered an injury and was not expected to play any part in the tournament; he was not replaced in the squad.

Tunisia
Coach: Jalel Kadri

Tunisia announced their final squad on 14 November 2022.

Group E

Costa Rica
Coach:  Luis Fernando Suárez

Costa Rica announced their final squad on 3 November 2022.

Germany
Coach: Hansi Flick

Germany announced their final squad on 10 November 2022.

Japan
Coach: Hajime Moriyasu

Japan announced their final squad on 1 November 2022. Yuta Nakayama withdrew injured on 3 November, and was replaced by Shuto Machino on 8 November.

Spain
Coach: Luis Enrique

Spain announced their final squad on 11 November 2022. José Gayà withdrew injured and was replaced by Alejandro Balde on 18 November.

Group F

Belgium
Coach:  Roberto Martínez

Belgium announced their final squad on 10 November 2022.

Canada
Coach:  John Herdman

Canada announced their final squad on 13 November 2022.

Croatia
Coach: Zlatko Dalić

Croatia announced a 34-man preliminary squad on 31 October 2022. The final squad was announced on 9 November.

Morocco
Coach: Walid Regragui

Morocco announced their final squad on 10 November 2022. Amine Harit withdrew injured and was replaced by Anass Zaroury on 16 November.

Group G

Brazil
Coach: Tite

Brazil announced their final squad on 7 November 2022.

Cameroon
Coach: Rigobert Song

Cameroon announced their final squad on 9 November 2022. André Onana left the squad on 28 November.

Serbia
Coach: Dragan Stojković

Serbia announced their final squad on 11 November 2022.

Switzerland
Coach: Murat Yakin

Switzerland announced their final squad on 9 November 2022.

Group H

Ghana
Coach: Otto Addo

Ghana announced a 55-man preliminary squad on 4 November 2022. The final squad was announced on 14 November.

Portugal
Coach: Fernando Santos

Portugal announced their final squad on 10 November 2022.

South Korea
Coach:  Paulo Bento

South Korea announced their final squad on 12 November 2022.

Uruguay
Coach: Diego Alonso

Uruguay announced a 55-man preliminary squad on 21 October 2022. The final squad was announced on 10 November.

Statistics

Note: Only the final squad list of each national team is taken into consideration.

Age

Outfield players
Oldest:  Atiba Hutchinson
Youngest:  Youssoufa Moukoko

Goalkeepers
Oldest:  Alfredo Talavera
Youngest:  Simon Ngapandouetnbu

Captains
Oldest:  Atiba Hutchinson
Youngest:  Tyler Adams

Coaches
Oldest:  Louis van Gaal
Youngest:  Lionel Scaloni

Player representation by league system
Nations in bold are represented at the tournament.

 The Qatar (hosts) and Saudi Arabia squads are made up entirely of players from the countries' domestic leagues.
 The Senegal squad is the only squad not to include any players employed by clubs in their home country.
 The Canada and Wales squads both include players employed by domestic clubs, but no players employed in the Canadian or Welsh domestic league systems. All Canadian domestic players play for Canadian teams in the American Major League Soccer; all Welsh domestic players play for Welsh teams in the English EFL Championship.
 Two squads have only one domestic-based player (Argentina and Serbia).
 The Brazil squad has the most players from a single foreign federation, with 12 players employed in England.
 Of the countries not represented by a national team at the World Cup, Italy's league provides the most squad members, with 70.
 The second-tier English Championship has 29 players selected, though none for England.
 The lowest league on a domestic pyramid to be represented at the World Cup is EFL League Two, the English fourth tier. It is represented by Welsh players Chris Gunter (AFC Wimbledon) and Jonny Williams (Swindon Town).

Player representation by club

Player representation by club confederation

Average age of squads

Coaches representation by country
Coaches in bold represented their own country.

Notes

References

External links
 

Squads
FIFA World Cup squads